Morris Llewelyn, Fflewellyan, Fflewellyn, Fuellen or Fludkyn (by 1522 – will proved 1568), of Wells, Somerset, was an English politician.

He was a Member (MP) of the Parliament of England for Wells in 1555.

References

1568 deaths
English MPs 1555
People from Wells, Somerset
Year of birth uncertain